Emiliano Fernández Rivarola (August 8, 1894 – September 15, 1949) was a Paraguayan poet, musician, and soldier. He is the author of more than 2,000 poems and participated in the Chaco War as an infantryman.

Childhood and youth
Emiliano Fernández was born to Silvestre Fernández and Bernarda Rivarola. During his first years he lived in the town of Ysaty, where he attended the elementary school until the 5th grade.

During the revolution of 1904, which took the Liberal Party, a traditional political group founded in 1887, to power, he moved to Concepción, where later he made the military service.

From the 1920s, with a bohemian spirit he began to travel to all the points of Paraguay, writing his first poems which he would then recite or sing with his guitar: “Primavera” (I y II), “Trigueñita” y “Pyhare amaguype”, published in  “Okara poty kue mi”, magazine of poetry and popular songs, edited for many years by the Trujillo family.
He later wrote two of his most popular songs in an epic tone: “Che la reina” o “Ahama che china” and “Rojas Silva rekavo”.
During the Chaco War, between Paraguay and Bolivia ( 1932–1935 ) he was a member of the Infantry regiment  “13 Tuyutí”, as a soldier, writing his best poems between the pauses of the battles. He was wounded and moved to Asunción.

As a soldier, in the first of battle Nanawa, when he was wounded in action, Fernández reached the summit of value and sacrifice. During the international conflict, his poems reached all the distant points of the country, giving enthusiasm and conviction of victory, which later gave him the nickname of “Tirteo verde olivo”, after the Spartan poet Tyrtaeus, an expression he owes to Mauricio Cardozo Ocampo.

More than 60 years later, whenever one of his songs is listened to, an inevitable patriotic emotion fills the hearts of his fellow citizens. The scholar and intellectual Carlos Villagra Marsal considers him the  most popular poet in Paraguay. With his poems written in “jopara” (mixture of guarani and Spanish) he could get deep inside the soul of his people.

One of the curiosities in his immense work are the verses dedicated to the women who had sometime had a relation with him, and there weren’t few: his wife, Maria Belen Lugo, Leandra Paredes, Zulmita Leon, Mercedes Rojas, Catalina Vallejos, Dominga Jara, Eloisa Osorio, Otilia Riquelme, Marciana de la Vega, among many others.

His last poem was dedicated to his nurse, Facunda Velásquez, a short time before dying.

He devoted himself to journalism  for a few years, working in the “Semanario Guaraní” with Facundo Recalde.  During his life he Publisher a small book named “Ka’aguy jary’i”, containing some of his more emblematic poems.

Mentions

In 1950, the Guarani Association of Writers declared him the “national Glory”.

History and works

Emilianore,  as he was known, was a synthesis of the Paraguayan bohemian world. He was a traveler and a late sleeper, he lived for a while in Sapucai, then in Caballero, then in San Pedro, Puerto Casado, Puerto Pinasco, Rancho Carambola (Brazil), and besides being a musician and a poet, he was also known for various activities such as carpenter, scouts guide, and forest man. In one of the files of his many works in Carlos Casado, we can see together with the firing paper, the following recommendation:” he is not to be taken ever as a worker in this company because he likes to party too much.”

Works

His extensive poetic work as well as musical incluyes, among others, the popular songs  “Asunción del Paraguay”, “Las siete cabrillas”, “Adiós che paraje kue”, “La última letra”, “Siete notas musicales”, “Guavirá poty”, “Oda pasional”, “Tupasy del campo”, “Despierta mi Angelina”, “Che pochyma nendive”, “Nda che pochyi nendive”, “¿Porqué?”, “De lejos vengo”, “Tujami”, “Jagua rekove”, “Mboriahu memby”, “Reten pe pyhare”, “13 Tuyutí”, “Soldado guaraní”, “1º de Marzo”, “Ñesuhame”, “Nde keguype”, “Nde juru mbyte”, “Farra chui che kepe guare”.

His last years

A short while before dying, he left a great message in his poem "Mi pluma": "my pen is a girl, my flag and my heroine, in the fight her audacity and her courage never stops, she is the spear that touches sharply, very softly a sentinel of my life, faithful guardian of my honor. It is my bohemian pen, the country harmony, failed by teutons with a mean instinct; she is the victim of the hatred of those stingy souls, 'late scholars of show off state'".

The historian Roberto A. Romero, among his biographers one of the main ones, refers about the circumstances of his death: ”On November 3, 1948, at around 6 pm , Emiliano arrived to the “Caracolito” store in the neighborhood Loma Kavara…There he was hit by a bullet from the shadows, who wounded him seriously…He had been ambushed. The author of the crime was never caught. The musicians Ricardo Pereira, Federico Esmerdel and Carlos Vera took him to the Militar hospital…. That night he underwent a surgery by Dr Pedro de Felice. He stayed there for a few months…but he didn’t recover from his wounds…he died…after a long suffering, at around 4.25 on September 15, 1949.” On the fact of his death, Okara poty kue mi says: "he died from a treacherous bullet".

The great Paraguayan poet Elvio Romero sang to him: “With a walking soul he went to rest on  death, in the sad instant of his walking. He left on an errant night and left us his songs.”

External links

Fernández's music in Guarani and German

References
 Centro Cultural el Cabildo 
 Diccionario Biográfico Forjadores del Paraguay, Primera Edicción Enero de 2000. Distribuidora Quevedo de Ediciones. Buenos Aires, Argentina. 

1894 births
1949 deaths
People from Guarambaré
20th-century Paraguayan poets
Paraguayan male poets
People of the Chaco War
Revolutionary Febrerista Party politicians
Deaths by firearm in Paraguay
20th-century male writers